The United States Ambassador-at-Large to Monitor and Combat Trafficking in Persons is the head of the Office to Monitor and Combat Trafficking in Persons in the United States Department of State.  The ambassador-at-large advises the United States  Secretary of State and the Under Secretary of State for Civilian Security, Democracy, and Human Rights directly and formulates U.S. policy on human trafficking. As the head of the Office to Monitor and Combat Trafficking in Persons, this Ambassador also has the rank of Assistant Secretary.

Nancy Ely-Raphel served as the first U.S. Ambassador-at-Large (2001–2002). She was followed by John R. Miller (2002–2006), Mark P. Lagon (2007–2009), Luis CdeBaca (2009–2014), Susan P. Coppedge (2015–2018) and John Cotton Richmond (2018–2021).

, the ambassadorship is held by Cindy Dyer.

List of ambassadors

References

External links
 United States Office to Monitor and Combat Trafficking in Persons